Ascidiaceihabitans is a Gram-negative and aerobic genus of bacteria from the family of Rhodobacteraceae with one known species (Ascidiaceihabitans donghaensis). Ascidiaceihabitans donghaensis has been isolated from the sea squirt Halocynthia aurantium from the Sea of Japan in Korea.

References

Rhodobacteraceae
Bacteria genera
Monotypic bacteria genera